The 2011 H1 Unlimited season was the fifty sixth running of the H1 Unlimited series for unlimited hydroplane, jointly sanctioned by APBA, its governing body in North America and UIM, its international body.

The season began in July with the Lucas Oil Indiana Governor's Cup (Madison Regatta), held in Madison, Indiana, United States.

The finale of the season was held in November with the Oryx Cup, held in Doha, Ad Dawhah, Qatar. The 2011 Oryx Cup was the 19th running of the UIM World Championship for unlimited hydroplanes.

Teams and drivers
All boats were powered by Lycoming T55 L7C, originally used in Chinook helicopters, only turbine engine currently permitted in the series.

Season schedule and results

National High Points Standings

Driver Points Standings

References

External links
 H1 Unlimited Website

Hydro
H1 Unlimited
H1 Unlimited seasons